Jak Je-geon was a low-ranking nobleman in the Kingdom of Unified Silla who would become the grandfather of Wang Geon, founder of Goryeo dynasty. After Goryeo's establishment, he was given a Posthumous name of King Gyeonggang the Great along with his Temple name of Uijo in 918. He was buried in Onhyereung tomb (온혜릉, 溫鞵陵).

Family
Father : Gukjo of Goryeo (고려 국조) – disputed.
Mother: Queen Jeonghwa (정화왕후)
Grandfather: Gang Bo-yuk (강보육)
Grandmother: Lady Gang Deok-ju (강덕주)
Wife: Queen Wonchang (원창왕후)
Son: Wang Ryung (왕륭) – married Lady Han, Queen Wisuk (위숙왕후).
Son: Wang Pyeong-dal (왕평달)
Unnamed son
Unnamed son
Unnamed daughter

See also 
 Founding legends of the Goryeo royal family

References

External links
고려 의조 on Encykorea .

Goryeo rulers
Silla people